Ravi is a male name. It means "sun" in Sanskrit.

People with the name include:

People
 Ravi (Ivar Johansen) (born 1976), a Norwegian artist
 Ravi Bharadwaj (born 1992), an Indian basketball player
 Ravi Bopara (born 1985), an English cricketer
 Ravi Hutheesing, musician (singer/songwriter, former guitarist of Hanson), aviator, lecturer
 Ravi Kant (disambiguation), several people
 Ravi Shankar (1920–2012), a sitar virtuoso
 Ravi (music director) (1926–2012), an Indian film music director
 Ravi Shankar (spiritual leader) (born 1956), a spiritual leader and founder of the Art of Living Foundation
 Ravi Shastri (born 1962), a former Indian cricketer
 Ravi Sood (born 1976), a Canadian-born financier
 Raja Ravi Varma (1848–1906), also known as Ravi Varma, Indian painter
 Ravi Zacharias (1946–2020), an Indian-born, Canadian-American evangelical Christian philosopher, apologist and evangelist
 Ravi Teja Bhupatiraju, an Indian actor who works mainly in Telugu films
 Ravi (rapper), stage name of Kim Won-sik, a member of the South Korean k-pop boy band VIXX
 Ravi Coltrane, American saxophonist and son of John Coltrane
 Ravi Ragbir, Trinidadian American immigration activist
 Ravi Narayana Reddy, founding member of the Communist Party of India and leader in the Telangana Rebellion
 Ravi Jagannathan, economist and professor
 Ravi Pushpakumara, Sri Lankan cricketer
 Ravi Ratnayeke, Sri Lankan cricketer

Fictional characters
 The in-training bookman in the manga D.Gray-man, also known as "Lavi" or "Rabi"
 Ravi Ross, a character in the Disney Channel TV series Jessie (2011 TV series) and Bunk'd
 Dr. Ravi Chakrabarti, a character from iZombie (TV series)
 Ravi, a main character in Power Rangers Beast Morphers
Ravi Panikkar, a recurring character on the first responders show 9-1-1.

References